The 1977 Hanafi Siege occurred on March 9–11, 1977 when three buildings in Washington, D.C., were seized by 12 Hanafi Movement gunmen. The gunmen were led by Hamaas Abdul Khaalis, who wanted to bring attention to the murder of his family in 1973. They took 149 hostages. After a 39-hour standoff, the gunmen surrendered and all remaining hostages were released from the District Building (the city hall; now called the John A. Wilson Building), B'nai B'rith headquarters, and the Islamic Center of Washington.

The gunmen killed 24-year-old Maurice Williams, a radio reporter from WHUR-FM, who stepped off a fifth-floor elevator into the crisis (the fifth floor is where the mayor and Council Chairmen have their offices). The gunmen also shot D.C. Protective Service Division police officer Mack Cantrell, who died in the hospital a few days later of a heart attack. Then-Councilman and future 4-term Washington, D.C., mayor Marion Barry walked into the hallway after hearing a commotion and was hit by a ricocheted shotgun pellet, which lodged just above his heart. He was taken out through a window and rushed to a hospital.

The gunmen had several demands. They wanted the government to hand over a group of men who had been convicted of killing seven relatives – mostly children – of takeover leader Hamaas Khaalis. They wanted those that were convicted of killing Malcolm X. They also demanded that the premiere of Mohammad, Messenger of God be canceled and the film destroyed because they considered it sacrilegious.

Time magazine noted: 
That the toll was not higher was in part a tribute to the primary tactic U.S. law enforcement officials are now using to thwart terrorists—patience. But most of all, perhaps, it was due to the courageous intervention of three Muslim ambassadors, Egypt's Ashraf Ghorbal, Pakistan's Sahabzada Yaqub-Khan and Iran's Ardeshir Zahedi.

Background 

The leader of the attack was Hamaas Abdul Khaalis, a former national secretary of the Nation of Islam. Khaalis was born Ernest McGhee in Indiana in 1921. Discharged from the U.S. Army on grounds of mental instability, he worked as a jazz drummer in New York City before converting to Islam and changing his name to Hamaas Khaalis. He became prominent in the ministries and schools of the Nation of Islam and was appointed its national secretary in the early 1950s.

Khaalis split with the Nation of Islam in 1958 to found a rival Islamic organization, the Hanafi Movement. In 1968, he was arrested for attempted extortion but released on grounds of mental illness. The same year, militant students at Howard University formed a group called the Kokayi family. When that was disbanded, many of its members became members of Hamaas' Hanafi American Mussulman's Rifle and Pistol Club, which was given a group membership charter by the National Rifle Association.

In 1972, Hamaas published an open letter attacking the leadership and beliefs of the Nation of Islam. A year later, five men broke into Khaalis' Washington, D.C., home and murdered five of his children, his nine-day-old grandson and another man. The murderers were arrested and sentenced to life imprisonment. The men were associated with the Nation of Islam, and the government did not hold the Nation of Islam accountable.

Building takeovers 
Less than an hour later, three men entered the Islamic Center of Washington, and took eleven hostages. At 2:20 pm, two Hanafis entered the District Building, three blocks from the White House. They went to the fifth floor looking for important people to take hostage.

When an elevator opened, the hostage-takers thought they were under assault and fired, killing Maurice Williams, a reporter for WHUR-FM radio, and injuring DC Protective Service Division Police Officer Mack Cantrell.  Then-councilman Marion Barry was struck by a ricochet in the chest and two others were wounded. "Throughout the siege Khaalis denounced the Jewish judge who had presided at the trial of his family's killers. 'The Jews control the courts and the press,' " he repeatedly charged.

Demands 
Khaalis and his followers wanted those convicted for the 1973 murders handed over to them, presumably for execution. They wanted those that were convicted of killing Malcolm X. They also wanted to receive visits from Muslim leader Warith Deen Mohammed and champion boxer Muhammad Ali, long an active Nation of Islam supporter. Khaalis also demanded that he be refunded $750 in legal fees caused by a contempt of court citation issued in response to shouting at one of the defendants on trial for murdering his family members. 

Time noted: "He also wanted the recently released film Mohammad, Messenger of God, to be banned on the grounds that it is sacrilegious. Khaalis' concern over the film was thought to have triggered the attack." He made this determination about the sacrilegious nature of the film based on the mistaken impression that Mohammad was a character seen or heard in the film, which is not the case. The main characters are relatives whose portrayal is not forbidden by religious tradition. The kidnappers made some of their demands on air by calling the then-popular broadcast journalist Max Robinson.

Negotiations and resolution 
When Khaalis was informed that people were worried about the fate of the hostages, Khaalis said, "Nobody showed any concern when my family was killed several years earlier." He told a reporter, 
Get on the phone and call President Carter and some of those senators that never sent a call, a condolence message. Do you not realize when my family was wiped out [no] one said one word? Not one. Not even a preacher. Not even a minister. Not even a spiritual advisor. Not even a city council member. So, I'm very glad you're worried now. When they wiped out my family, I didn't hear about your sympathy and emotions. I got a letter the other day from my brother telling me how the brother was swaggering around in jail, the killer of Malcolm, walking around with guards protecting him. Well tell him it's over. Tell him it's payday.

The money from the contempt of court citation was returned and the movie premiere was cancelled. Convicted killers of his family and Malcolm X were not delivered. 

On the evening of the following day, after a number of phone calls, the three ambassadors and some Washington, D.C., officials (including police commander Joseph O'Brien, who had investigated the murder of Khaalis' children and was trusted by Khaalis) met with the Hanafis. The ambassadors of Pakistan, Iran, and Egypt read the Quran with Khaalis to appeal to his conscience. Finally, Khaalis and the others involved in the hostage taking at the two sites where no one was killed were allowed to be charged and then freed on their own recognizance. All 12 were later tried and convicted, with Khaalis receiving a sentence of 21 to 120 years for his role.

Aftermath 
Khaalis died at the Federal Correctional Complex Prison in Butner, North Carolina, on November 13, 2003. Marion Barry recovered from his wounds and was later elected mayor. In 2007, the fifth floor press room at the Wilson Building was named for the slain reporter, Maurice Williams. Abdul Muzikir, who shot and killed Williams, was sentenced to 70 years in prison and released in 2022.

In popular culture

John W. King wrote about the Hanafi siege in his book, The Breeding of Contempt.  The book chronicles the siege and his family's becoming the first African American family in the Federal Witness Protection Program after the massacre of the Khaalis family.

The siege is mentioned in Joni Mitchell's song "Otis And Marlena" from her 1977 album Don Juan's Reckless Daughter. In the song, the title characters travel "for sun and fun / While Muslims stick up Washington".

The Jonathan Leaf play The Caterers, which was produced Off Broadway in 2005, portrayed a modern-day version of the siege.
 
Filmmaker David Simon reused an anecdote from the siege in his 2020 HBO drama The Plot Against America. Simon's father, Bernard Simon, was taken hostage in 1977 while serving as public relations director for B'nai B'rith. Tasked with finding food, he noticed that the bologna sandwiches provided by a nearby hotel were not kosher and would therefore be unacceptable to a number of the Jewish hostages. According to David Simon, his father joked, "Mayonnaise on white bread? I think they're trying to kill us."

University of Richmond associate professor of journalism Shahan Mufti was awarded the 2020 J. Anthony Lukas Work-In-Progress Award for his manuscript of American Caliph, an account of the 1977 siege. The book was published in November 2022 by Farrar, Straus and Giroux.

See also
1973 New York City hostage incident
Black Mafia
List of journalists killed in the United States
Major Coxson
Zebra murders
List of attacks on Jewish institutions in the United States
List of incidents of political violence in Washington, D.C.

References

1977 in Washington, D.C.
1977 murders in the United States
Washington
Antisemitism in Washington, D.C.
B'nai B'rith
Crimes in Washington, D.C.
Deaths by firearm in Washington, D.C.
Hate crimes
Hostage taking in the United States
Islam and antisemitism
Islam in Washington, D.C.
Jews and Judaism in Washington, D.C.
Journalists killed in the United States
March 1977 events in the United States
Nation of Islam
Sunni Islamists
African and Black nationalism
Post–civil rights era in African-American history
March 1977 crimes